The Sietinden Range is a range of mountains in far North-eastern Russia. Administratively the range is part of the Sakha Republic, Russian Federation.

Batagay-Alyta, the only permanent settlement in the area, lies off the southeastern slopes of the range.

History
Previously uncharted, this range was first put on the map in 1932 by Soviet geologist Ivan Atlasov, Professor of the Arctic and Antarctic Research Institute, who carried out geological surveys in Yakutia. After having explored and mapped most of the Orulgan Range to the west, Atlasov sighted the Sietinden Range rising above the left bank of the upper Omoloy.

Geography 
The Sietinden is one of the northern subranges of the Verkhoyansk Range system. It is located in the main ridge, stretching southwards to the west of the Orulgan Range and almost parallel to it. The valley of the Omoloy river, which has its source in the range, runs on the eastern flanks of the range and along the western side flows the Kuranakh-Yuryakh. The Kular Range rises to the east, beyond the Omoloy.

Flora
The mountain slopes are covered with sparse larch forests and the valleys with tundra.

See also
List of mountains and hills of Russia

References

External links
Ancient Middle-Carboniferous Flora of the Orulgan Range (Northern Verkhoyansk) and justification of Age Bylykat Formation
Liverwort Flora of Yakutia
Verkhoyansk Range

ceb:Siyetindenskiy Khrebet
pl:Sijetindienskij chriebiet
sah:Сиэтэндэ